The Chansonnier Cordiforme (1470s), or Chansonnier de Jean de Montchenu, is a cordiform (heart-shaped) music manuscript, Collection Henri de Rothschild MS 2973, held in the Bibliothèque Nationale, Paris, France.

The manuscript was commissioned in Savoy between 1460 and 1477 by canon Jean de Montchenu, later Bishop of Agen (1477) and Bishop of Vivier (1478–1497). An edition was prepared by Geneviève Thibault de Chambure in 1952, and the complete manuscript was recorded by Anthony Rooley and the Consort of Musicke.

Songs
The chansonnier comprises 43 songs by Dufay, Binchois, Ockeghem, Busnoys and others including several unica.

References

External links 
 Cordiforme Chansonnier; Chansonnier de Jean de Montchenu Source Description and Bibliography at the Digital Image Archive of Medieval Music
 
 Facsimile edition: Chansonnier de Jean de Montchenu

15th-century illuminated manuscripts
Bibliothèque nationale de France collections
Chansonniers (books)
Cordiform manuscripts
French manuscripts
Renaissance music
Renaissance music manuscript sources